Kratka was a community in rural Pennington County, Minnesota, United States.

A post office called Kratka was established in 1904, and remained in operation until 1928. The community was named for Frank H. Kratka, a pioneer merchant.

References

External links
  1909 Map - See section 22 "Creamery, Kratka P.O."
  Kratka, Pennington County, MN a Czech community

Former populated places in Pennington County, Minnesota
Former populated places in Minnesota